Sally in Our Alley is a 1927 American silent comedy drama film directed by Walter Lang and starring Shirley Mason. The film is considered to be lost.

Cast
 Shirley Mason as Sally
 Richard Arlen as Jimmie Adams
 Alec B. Francis as Sandy Mack
 Paul Panzer as Tony Garibaldi
 William H. Strauss as Abraham Lapidowitz
 Kathlyn Williams as Mrs. Gordon Mansfield
 Florence Turner as Mrs. Williams
 Harry Crocker as Chester Drake

References

External links
 

1927 films
1927 comedy-drama films
American silent feature films
American black-and-white films
Films directed by Walter Lang
Lost American films
Columbia Pictures films
1927 lost films
Lost comedy-drama films
1920s English-language films
1920s American films
Silent American comedy-drama films